Vivien Grace Swan (née Bishop) (12 January 1943 – 1 January 2009) was a British archaeologist. She made a significant contribution to the study of Roman pottery.

Career
Swan read Archaeology at Cardiff University, graduating in 1965. In December 1965 she was appointed an investigator at the Royal Commission on the Historical Monuments of England, and was one of the first women to take up such an appointment in any of the Royal Commissions.

She learnt to excavate with Leslie Alcock at Dinas Powys hillfort whilst still at school.

As an undergraduate, she excavated with Richard J. C. Atkinson at Wayland's Smithy.

She was awarded a DLitt from Cardiff University in 2001.

Affiliations and other activities
Swan was a member of the Study Group for Roman Pottery since its inception in 1971. After formalisation in 1985, she served as its first President until 1990. She was an active participant in almost every conference and organised six of them.

She was a Trustee of the Rei Cretariae Romanae Fautores, an international society dedicated to the study of Roman ceramics.

Awards and honours
Lifetime achievement award at the British Archaeological Awards in November 2008 at the British Museum.

Selected publications
1984. The pottery kilns of Roman Britain. RCHME.
1988. Pottery in Roman Britain (4th edition). Shire Archaeology.
1995. (with H G Welfare) Roman Camps in England: the field archaeology. RCHME.
2009. Ethnicity, Conquest and Recruitment: Two case studies from the Northern Military Provinces. JRA Supplementary Series 72. Portsmouth, Rhode Island.

References 

1943 births
2009 deaths
Alumni of Cardiff University
Women classical scholars
British archaeologists
20th-century archaeologists
British women archaeologists
People of the Royal Commission on the Historical Monuments of England
Scholars of ancient Roman pottery